The Temptation of St Anthony is a circa 1525 to 1530 oil on panel painting by a follower of Hieronymus Bosch, now in the Centraal Museum in Utrecht.

References

Paintings in the collection of the Centraal Museum
1520s paintings
Hieronymus Bosch
Paintings of Anthony the Great